Bundi is a city and municipality in Rajasthan, India.

It can also mean:

 Bundi district, of which Bundi is the capital
 Bundi dagger, known as a Katar (कटार)
 Bundi, Papua New Guinea